Alexander Hill is a  hill with a prominent seaward cliff face, lying south of Harrison Stream and Cinder Hill on the lower ice-free west slopes of Mount Bird, Ross Island, Antarctica. It was mapped by the New Zealand Geological Survey Antarctic Expedition, 1958–59, and named by the New Zealand Antarctic Place-Names Committee for B.N. Alexander, a surveyor with the expedition.

References
 

Hills of Ross Island